Isochronous media access controller (I-MAC) is a media access control whereby data must be transferred isochronously—in other words, the data must be transmitted at a steady rate, without interruption.

Media access control
Telecommunications equipment